Saint Amphilochius was a church that, until the 1920s, stood on the citadel of Konya, Turkey. The church was venerated by both Greeks and Turks, and was discussed by the scholar F.W. Hasluck.

Sources
Gertrude Bell and William Ramsay, The Thousand and One Churches (Hodder and Stoughton, 1909): pp. 403–406.
Semavi Evyice “Konya’nın Alaeddin Tepesinde Selçuklu Öncesine Ait Bir Eser: Eflâtûn Mescidisi,” Sanat Tarihi Yıllıġı 4 (1970-1).
F.W. Hasluck, Christianity and Islam Under the Sultans, edited by Margaret M. Hasluck, reprint of 1929 (Istanbul: Isis Press, 2000): pp. 11, 66, 70, 314–19.  (N.B. the pagination is different in the Isis and Oxford editions)
Scott Redford, “The Alâeddin Mosque Reconsidered” Artibus Asiae, vol. 51, no. 1/2. (1991): p. 54.

See also
Amphilochius of Iconium 
Alâeddin Mosque (Konya, Turkey)

Buildings and structures in Konya
Eastern Orthodox church buildings in Turkey
Culture in Konya